Armenian opera is the art of opera in Armenia or opera by Armenian composers. The founder of the Armenian operatic tradition was Tigran Chukhajian (1837–98), who was born in Constantinople in the Ottoman Empire and received his musical education in Milan, where he became a great admirer of Verdi. He was a political and musical nationalist who mixed Western and Armenian influences in his work. His Arshak Erkrord is regarded as the first Armenian opera. It was written in 1868 but had to wait until 1945 for a full staging. The libretto, by Tovmas Terzian, is based on the life of the 4th-century king Arsaces II (Arshak II). Chukhadjian's other operas include Arifi khardakhutyune (The Government Inspector, based on the play by Gogol, 1872); Zemire (1891), which was written in Turkish and premiered in Constantinople; as well as Kyose Kyokhva ("The Balding Elder"), Lelebidj ("The Pea Seller") and Indiana.

The next important composer of Armenian opera was Armen Tigran Tigranian (1878-1950) who lived in Russian Armenia and the Armenian Soviet Socialist Republic. He wrote Anoush, set in the Armenian countryside, in 1912 (first performed in Alexandrapol) but it had to wait until 1935 for its full professional staging at the Armenian National Opera Theater. It made heavy use of folk music, as did Tigranyan's last opera, David Bek (1950). Based on the life of the eponymous national hero and set in the 18th century, it depicts the struggle between Armenians and Safavid Persians. Other leading Armenian opera composers include Alexander Spendiaryan and Haro Stepanian.

Sources
Donald Grout A Short History of Opera (Columbia University Press, 4th ed., 2003)

Opera by country
Armenian music